Bikesh Kuthu (born 24 June 1993) is a Nepalese professional footballer who plays as goalkeeper for Tribhuvan Army Club and Nepal national team. Kuthu made his international debut against Cameroon on August 26, 2012 in New Delhi.

Early life
Bikesh Kuthu was born and raised in Sindhupalchowk District in a family of athletes. His brother BM Kuthu is graduate of Anfa Acedemy.

Club career
Kuthu made his professional debut with the Himalayan Sherpa Club. He was signed later on by the newly promoted Madhyapur Youth Association. He showed excellent individual performance in Ncell Cup. After relegation of Madhyapur Youth Association from A division league, Kuthu signed for Jawalakhel YC. 

In 2015, Kuthu was signed by Nepal Army Club. 

In 2021, Kuthu was chosen as marquee and captain of Kathmandu Rayzrs F.C., in the inaugural season of the Nepalese Franchise league Nepal Super League. He was also retained as Marquee player for 2022 season.

International career
Kuthu made his international debut against Cameroon on August 26, 2012 in New Delhi.

Career statistics

International

Club honours
 Kathmandu Rayzers FC
Nepal Super League
 Champions (1): 2021

Individual honours
Best Goalkeeper:
 Ncell Cup  : 2012
Best Goalkeeper:
 Bangabandhu Cup  : 2016

References 

Living people
1993 births
People from Sindhupalchowk District
Nepalese footballers
Nepal international footballers
Association football goalkeepers
Footballers at the 2014 Asian Games
Asian Games competitors for Nepal